Pearl Alcock (1934 Jamaica – 2006, London, England) was a  club owner and artist, best known as a British outsider artist.

Life and work
Alcock moved to the UK from Jamaica at the age of 25, abandoning her marriage in Jamaica.

The shop, the bar and the cafe on Railton Road 
First finding work as a maid in Leeds, by the 1970s she had opened a dress shop at 103 Railton Road in Brixton  and underneath it created an illegal shebeen, popular with the local gay community. She herself was known to be bisexual. After the first Brixton uprising reduced the amount of customers to her shop she shut it down and opened a cafe at 105 Railton Road. The 1985 Brixton uprising brought more financial hardship culminating to a period of the cafe running by candle light as the electricity was shut off.

Art career 
Pearl’s journey with art began when she was unable to afford a birthday card for a friend so she drew one. Alcock described this realization of her knack for drawing: “I went mad scribbling on anything I laid my hands on,”she explains, “friends admired what I had done and began to bring me materials to use, that is how I started.”

By the late 80s she was getting more recognition, her art being exhibited at the 198 Gallery, the Almeida Theatre and the Bloomsbury Theatre. Then in 1990 her work was included in the London Fire Brigade calendar.

Monika Kinley, one of the country's leading advocates of Outsider Art, describes her as "a visual poet". She gained mainstream recognition a year before her death when in 2005 her work was included in Tate Britain's first exhibition of art shown under the term Outsider Art.

In spite of her high regard in the context of Outsider Art, Pearl Alcock's work has been offered at auction multiple times and only one artwork has sold; this was "Thukela (Tugela) River", which realized $294 USD at Germann Auctions in 2012. In 2019 she was the subject of the retrospective at the Whitworth Art Gallery, Manchester.

Selected exhibitions
2022: COMING HOME - A retrospective of the work of Pearl Alcock, 198 Gallery 
2019: Pearl Alcock, Whitworth Art Gallery, Manchester
2005: Outsider Art, Tate Britain, London
1989: Three Brixton Artists: Pearl Alcock, George Kelly, Michael Ross, 198 Gallery, London
1989: Mood Paintings, 198 Gallery

The Brixton LGBTQ Community 
Alcock’s shebeen had an unprecedentedly important place in the Brixton LGBTQ scene for the time. A white British man named Simon recalled the place as a hub of interaction for both the local LGBTQ black and white populations:

“Always heaving...a space this sort of size packed with people dancing, and there would be a bar at the end selling Heineken or cocktail type stuff, martinis and so on...there were only one or two women there, about 80 % black men, 20 % white I suppose. Of the black guys that would go to Pearl’s...maybe half of them would be in a relationship with a white person, and half would be in a relationship with a black person.”

Death 
Pearl died on 7 May 2006 at the age of 72. She was living nearby to where she had been running the three  different establishments on Railton Street, and she was still making art. Many attended her funeral.

References

Further reading
Kinley, Monika. "Monika's Story: A Personal History of the Musgrave Kinley Outsider Collection". Musgrave Kinley Outsider Trust, 2005

External links
 Pearl Alcock artwork

1934 births
2006 deaths
20th-century British women artists
Bisexual women
British bisexual people
Black British artists
Black British women
British artists
Jamaican artists
Migrants from British Jamaica to the United Kingdom
Jamaican women artists
LGBT Black British people
LGBT history in the United Kingdom
Outsider artists
People from Brixton
Women outsider artists
20th-century British LGBT people